Pollenia atramentaria is a species of cluster fly in the family Polleniidae.

Distribution
Andorra, Austria, Belarus, Czech Republic, France, Germany, Italy, Latvia, Lithuania, Netherlands, Poland, Romania, Russia, Slovakia, Spain, Switzerland, Ukraine.

References

Polleniidae
Insects described in 1826
Diptera of Europe
Taxa named by Johann Wilhelm Meigen